Yuttana Charoenphon (born 14 August 2000) is a Thai tennis player.

Charoenphon has a career high ATP singles ranking of 939 achieved on 8 August 2022. He also has a career high ATP doubles ranking of 1106 achieved on 8 August 2022.

Charoenphon represents Thailand at the Davis Cup, where he has a W/L record of 1–1.

References

External links

2000 births
Living people
Yuttana Charoenphon
Yuttana Charoenphon